Elena Barozzi (1514 - 1580) was a celebrated Venetian patrician.

Life 
Elena's reputation for her elegance is praised by the poets and painters of her century. Titian and Giorgio Vasari portrayed it.
The poet Lelio Capilupi dedicated the ballad to her Ne l'amar e fredd'onde si bagna.
The poet Fortunio Spira comparing it to the beauties of classical antiquity, also the writer Lodovico Domenichi describes her as Greek for beauty and Roman for personality likes Lucretia.

Elena Barozzi, for her fine intellectuality was admired and courted by the finest men of her time. She had a relationship and a daughter with Lorenzino de' Medici, the daughter named Lorenzina born in 1547, future wife of Giulio Colonna.

Notes

References 
 
 
 
 
 
 
 

Barozzi family
16th-century Venetian people